Kim Sun-bin (born December 18, 1989) is a South Korean professional baseball infielder for the Kia Tigers of the KBO League.

After 2019 season, he earned FA qualification and stayed at $4 billion (4 billion KRW) in total for four years

References

External links
Career statistics and player information from Korea Baseball Organization

Kim Sun-bin at Kia Tigers Baseball Club 

Kia Tigers players
South Korean baseball players
KBO League infielders
Sportspeople from South Jeolla Province
1989 births
Living people